Matthew Edward Murphy (born 23 July 1984) is an English musician, singer, and songwriter. He is best known as the lead vocalist, guitarist, and primary songwriter of The Wombats, which he co-founded in 2003. He began a solo career under the name Love Fame Tragedy in 2018.

Early life
Matthew Edward Murphy was born in the Woolton suburb of Liverpool on 23 July 1984, the son of a mother who works for Liverpool City Council and a father who teaches engineering. He has said that he "didn't come from money, but didn't have very humble beginnings either". He began playing the guitar at the age of five, primarily at the behest of his father. He was educated at Liverpool College in the neighbouring suburb of Mossley Hill, where he "smoked a lot of weed all the time and played in a lot of weird bands" and just barely managed to pass his A-levels. He later studied music at the Liverpool Institute of Performing Arts (LIPA), where he met his future Wombats bandmates. He joined his first band at the age of 13. He began suffering from depression and anxiety as a teenager, and was prescribed antidepressants after experiencing severe panic attacks at LIPA. He later detailed his issues with the medication in the song "Anti-D".

Career

The Wombats

Murphy is the lead singer and guitarist of rock trio The Wombats, alongside Tord Øverland Knudsen (bass) and Dan Haggis (drums). The band began as "a joke [they] didn't want anyone to find funny". The band was initially launched when the Liverpool Institute for Performing Arts gave them the chance to play various gigs. They then ended up gaining radio play in the UK with songs such as "Let's Dance to Joy Division" and "Moving to New York". Their first album, A Guide to Love, Loss & Desperation, was released on 5 November 2007 with success following a European tour and an Arbor Day party at Liverpool Academy. The album achieved platinum status in the UK.

The Wombats appeared in a 2008 episode of the Australian music quiz show Spicks and Specks, on which Murphy was a contestant; later in the episode, he appeared with his Wombats bandmates in a segment where bassist Knudsen sang the Postman Pat theme song in his native Norwegian. That same year, the band performed a cover of Leona Lewis' song "Bleeding Love" at the MTV Europe Music Awards and their own song "Jump into the Fog" on an episode of The Tonight Show with Jay Leno.

The band's second album, This Modern Glitch, was released on 25 April 2011 and was a chart success, reaching No. 3 in the UK and No. 2 in Australia. The band released their third album, Glitterbug, on 13 April 2015; reviews were mixed, though it became the band's first album to appear on the U.S. Billboard 200, where it peaked at No. 91. To promote the album, they appeared on Late Night with Seth Meyers to perform "Greek Tragedy" on 28 April. Their fourth album, Beautiful People Will Ruin Your Life, was released on 9 February 2018 to positive reviews. Their fifth studio album, titled Fix Yourself, Not the World, was released on 14 January 2022 and reached the top spot in the UK Albums Chart, becoming their first UK No. 1 album.

Love Fame Tragedy
In 2018, Murphy revealed that he had written 20 new tracks for a new album called I Don't Want to Play the Victim, But I'm Really Good at It. In June 2019, he announced that the album would be released under a new solo project by the name of Love Fame Tragedy, alongside a tour announcement and a debut single called "My Cheating Heart". The debut 4-track EP was produced by Mark Crew and released in September 2019 to generally positive reviews. In March 2020, he released the five-track EP Five Songs to Briefly Fill the Void. Four months later, he released the debut Love Fame Tragedy studio album Wherever I Go, I Want to Leave to positive reviews.

Personal life
Murphy married American hotel manager Akemi Topel on 7 October 2017. They live in the Mount Washington neighbourhood of Los Angeles, and have two daughters named Dylan (born 2019) and Kai (born January 2021).

While his Wombats bandmates are avid football fans, with drummer Dan Haggis supporting their hometown team Everton FC and bassist Tord Knudsen supporting Manchester United FC, Murphy prefers to play golf and has never specified a preferred football team. However, in a May 2020 fundraising video on Everton's YouTube channel during the COVID-19 pandemic, Murphy and Haggis were described as "top Everton-supporting artists". Their section of the video featured them performing Wombats songs, with all donations going to a campaign set up by Everton to provide support to people who had been made especially vulnerable and isolated by the pandemic.

Discography

The Wombats 

Studio albums
 A Guide to Love, Loss & Desperation (2007)
 This Modern Glitch (2011)
 Glitterbug (2015)
 Beautiful People Will Ruin Your Life (2018)
 Fix Yourself, Not the World (2022)

Love Fame Tragedy

Studio albums

Extended plays

Singles

References

1984 births
Living people
Alumni of the Liverpool Institute for Performing Arts
English male guitarists
English male singers
English rock guitarists
English rock singers
Musicians from Liverpool
People educated at Liverpool College
People from Mount Washington, Los Angeles
21st-century British guitarists
21st-century British male singers
21st-century English singers